Nome Public Schools (NPS), also known as the Nome City School District, is the school district serving the city of Nome, Alaska.  The district has one of the highest efficiencies in Western Alaska.  The current superintendent of the district is Jamie Burgess.

Though public schools have existed in Nome since 1902, the present-day school district exists mostly to fulfill the obligation that first-class cities in the Unorganized Borough have under state law to provide education and planning/zoning functions within their cities.  As such, it is separate from the Bering Strait School District which serves the smaller communities of the surrounding area.

NPS oversees five schools: two traditional grade-based schools (one for elementary grades and one for junior and senior high school grades), plus a charter magnet school, a correspondence program and a school program located in Nome Youth Facility.  These five schools have a total enrollment of approximately 720 students, with enrollment per school ranging from 15 to 375.

History
The district's lineage extends to the establishment of the City of Nome in 1901.

The first local school in Nome was officially established in 1902.

Historic Superintendent List

Schools
 Anvil City Science Academy, a 5–8 charter, is also part of the school district.
 Extensions Correspondence School
 Nome-Beltz Junior/Senior High School, serves grades 7–12.
 Nome Elementary School, serves grades K-6.
 Nome Youth Facility

See also
 List of school districts in Alaska

References

External links
 

Education in Unorganized Borough, Alaska
School districts in Alaska
Nome, Alaska
1902 establishments in Alaska